Jorge Pizarro Soto (born April 21, 1952) is a Chilean politician with brief Political Science studies. Since March 1997 he has been a senator for Coquimbo and was the president of the senate from 2010 to 2011. He is a member of the Christian Democratic Party. He is also a member of the editorial committee of the Cambio 21 newspaper.

References

External links

1952 births
Living people
Chilean people of Extremaduran descent
People from Ovalle
University of Chile alumni
Christian Democratic Party (Chile) politicians
Members of the Senate of Chile
Presidents of the Senate of Chile
Senators of the LV Legislative Period of the National Congress of Chile
Members of the Latin American Parliament